The 2018 LBA Playoffs, officially known as the 2018 LBA Playoff, were the final phase of the 2017–18 LBA season. The Playoffs started on May 12, 2018, and ended on June 15, 2018, with the Finals.

Umana Reyer Venezia were the defending champions.

EA7 Emporio Armani Milano won their 28th title by beating Dolomiti Energia Trento in game 6 of the finals.

Qualified teams
The eight first qualified teams after the end of the regular season qualified to the playoffs.

Bracket
 As of 15 June 2018.

Quarterfinals
The quarterfinals were played in a best of five format.

EA7 Emporio Armani Milano v Red October Cantù

Germani Basket Brescia v Openjobmetis Varese

Umana Reyer Venezia v Vanoli Cremona

Sidigas Avellino v Dolomiti Energia Trento

Semifinals
The semifinals were played in a best of five format.

EA7 Emporio Armani Milano v Germani Basket Brescia

Umana Reyer Venezia v Dolomiti Energia Trento

Finals

The finals were played in a best of seven format.

EA7 Emporio Armani Milano v Dolomiti Energia Trento

References

External links
Official website

2017–18 in Italian basketball
LBA Playoffs